Events from the year 1889 in Ireland.

Events
June – Edward Carson becomes the youngest QC in Ireland (aged 35).
12 June – the Armagh rail disaster occurs near Armagh: runaway carriages from a Sunday school excursion collide with an oncoming train, killing 80, the worst railway accident in Ireland ever.
16 July – Ballymena and Larne Railway taken over by Belfast and Northern Counties Railway.
1 November – Portrush life-boat The Robert and Agnes Blair, going to the aid of the schooner Dryad, capsizes off the coast at Portballintrae with the loss of three of her thirteen crew.
24 December – Irish nationalist Charles Stewart Parnell is accused of adultery after Captain Willy O'Shea files for divorce on the grounds his wife Kitty O'Shea had an affair with Parnell. The scandal will later result in the dismissal of Parnell as leader of the Irish Parliamentary Party.
 A religious group of the Order of Carmelites leave Dublin for the United States at the invitation of the New York Archbishop later establishing the Provence of St. Elias.
 The National Society for the Prevention of Cruelty to Children is founded.
 The Land League builds a house for recently evicted tenant Tom Kelly in Kiltimagh, County Mayo.
 Poet William Butler Yeats is introduced by John O'Leary to Irish nationalist Maude Gonne.
 Industrialist Horace Plunkett returns to Ireland after his father's death.
The Tropical Ravine House in Belfast Botanic Gardens is built by head gardener Charles McKimm.
Foundation stone laid for the Albert Bridge, Belfast, by Queen Victoria's grandson, Prince Albert Victor.
The Cork County Southern Star weekly newspaper is established in Skibbereen, incorporating The Skibbereen Eagle (1857).

Arts and literature
 Percy French writes the comic song Slattery's Mounted Foot.
 John Thomas Gilbert's Calendar of Ancient Records of the Corporation of Dublin is published.
 Alfred Graves writes the lyrics of "Father O'Flynn".
 Douglas Hyde publishes Beside the Fire.
 George Moore publishes Mike Fletcher.
 Standish James O'Grady publishes Red Hugh's Captivity.
 Whitworth Porter publishes History of the Corps of Royal Engineers.
 Amye Reade's Ruby is published.
 Dr. G. T. Stokes publishes Ireland and the Anglo-Norman Church.
 Oscar Wilde publishes his dialogue The Decay of Lying and story The Portrait of Mr. W. H..
 W. B. Yeats publishes The Wanderings of Oisin and Other Poems (including Down by the Salley Gardens) and Crossways.

Sport

Boxing
 8 July – the last official bare-knuckle title fight ever held as Irish American Heavyweight Champion John L. Sullivan defeats Jake Kilrain in a world championship bout lasting 75 rounds in Mississippi.

Football
International
2 March England 6–0 Ireland (in Liverpool)
9 March Scotland 7–0 Ireland (in Glasgow)
27 April Ireland 1–3 Wales (in Belfast)
Irish Cup
Winners: Distillery 5–4 YMCA
Glenavon F.C. was founded in Lurgan, County Armagh.

Gaelic Games
 The first GAA Armagh Championship is held.
 The hierarchy of the Catholic Church, including Archbishop Logue, condemn the GAA for its violence and demoralising influences as well as charging the association as a recruiting ground of radical nationalist organizations.
 24 March – The first Cavan Gaelic Athletic Association (GAA) convention is held in Armagh.
 8 September – The Cavan Gaelic Athletic Association holds a football game between Killinkere and Crosserlough. The game is reported by The Anglo-Celt as "..More like a contest between 42 dangerous and ferocious wire haired lunatics than any competition."

Golf
 The Royal County Down Golf Club is founded in Newcastle, County Down.
 The Royal Dublin Golf Club moves from Sutton to its present home on Bull Island.
 Golf is first played at the Dooks Golf Club in Killorglin, County Kerry, and at the Portstewart Golf Club.

Births
1 January – Patrick MacGill of Glenties, "navvy poet", journalist and novelist (died 1963).
10 January – Maurice Collis, colonial administrator and writer (died 1973).
2 February – Dorothy Macardle, author and historian (died 1958).
19 February – Albert Stewart, rugby player (killed in action 1917).
8 March – Ina Boyle, composer (died 1967).
17 March – Harry Clarke, stained glass artist and book illustrator (died 1931).
17 March – Fionán Lynch, Sinn Féin MP and TD, member of 1st Dáil, Cabinet Minister, Cumann na nGaedheal and Fine Gael TD (died 1966).
12 April – Patrick McGilligan, Cumann na nGaedheal/Fine Gael TD and Cabinet Minister (died 1979).
13 April – Ernest Blythe, writer, journalist and theatre manager, member of 1st Dáil and Cabinet Minister (born 1975).
31 May – Helen Waddell, poet, translator and playwright (died 1965).
7 June – Frank Duff, founder of the Legion of Mary (died 1980).
10 June – Jack Finlay, Laois hurler and TD (died 1942).
June – James Sleator, painter (died 1950).
19 July – John Vincent Holland, soldier, recipient of the Victoria Cross for gallantry in 1916 at Guillemont, France (died 1975).
22 July – Conor Maguire, Chief Justice of Ireland (died 1971).
22 August – Seán MacEntee, Fianna Fáil TD and Tánaiste from 1959 to 1965 (died 1984).
28 September – Seán Keating, painter (died 1977).
17 November
James Duffy, soldier, recipient of the Victoria Cross for gallantry in 1917 at Kereina Peak, Palestine (died 1969).
Séamus Ó Grianna, writer (died 1969).
20 November – Brian Oswald Donn-Byrne, New York-born novelist (died 1928).
24 November – James Macauley, soccer player (died 1945).
1 December – Michael Hayes, Pro-Treaty TD, Cabinet Minister, Ceann Comhairle of Dáil Éireann and Seanad Éireann member (died 1976).
24 December – Patrick MacGill, journalist, poet and novelist (died 1963).
Full date unknown
Joan de Sales La Terriere, born Joan Grubb, socialite, equestrienne and divorcée (died 1968).

Deaths
23 January – Michael Joseph Barry, poet (born 1817).
9 February – Peter Lalor, leader of the Eureka Stockade rebellion in Australia (born 1827).
29 February – Richard Pigott, newspaper editor, suicide (born 1835.
16 March – Hans Crocker, lawyer and Wisconsin politician (born 1815).
13 April – Thomas Lane, recipient of the Victoria Cross for gallantry in 1860 at the Taku Forts, China (born 1836).
10 May – Edward Jennings, soldier, recipient of the Victoria Cross for gallantry in 1857 at Lucknow, India (b. c.1820).
31 May – Charles Lanyon, architect (born 1813 in England).
8 June – Gerard Manley Hopkins, Jesuit poet and scholar (born 1844 in England).
19 July – Patrick Green, soldier, recipient of the Victoria Cross for gallantry in 1857 at Delhi, India (born 1824).
6 October – Hans Garrett Moore, soldier, recipient of the Victoria Cross for gallantry in 1877 at Komgha, South Africa (born 1830).
21 October – John Ball, politician, naturalist and Alpine traveller (born 1818).
18 November – William Allingham, poet and diarist (born 1824).
29 November – Arthur Gerald Geoghegan, poet.
7 December – John Tuigg, third Roman Catholic Bishop of Pittsburgh, Pennsylvania (born 1828).
Full date unknown – Dr. Henry Hudson, magazine editor.

References

 
1880s in Ireland
Years of the 19th century in Ireland
Ireland
Ireland